Hildoceras is a genus of ammonite from the Jurassic period in the family Hildoceratidae. The shells are characterized by a narrow discoidal evolute shape, keeled venter,  concave ribs along the outer flanks, and a shallow spiral groove running along smooth inner flanks.  Whorls slightly overlap, cross sections are compressed.  The ventral keel is bordered on either side by a shallow groove. The genus was named by Alpheus Hyatt after Saint Hilda in 1876.

Distribution
Jurassic of Bulgaria, France, Germany, Hungary, Italy, Japan, Luxembourg, Serbia and Montenegro, Spain, the United Kingdom and Iran.

Species
 Hildoceras ameuri 
 Hildoceras apertum 
 Hildoceras bifrons 
 Hildoceras caterinii 
 Hildoceras crassum 
 Hildoceras lusitanicum 
 Hildoceras semipolitum 
 Hildoceras snoussi 
 Hildoceras sublevisoni 
 Hildoceras tethysi

References
Notes

Bibliography
 

Ammonitida genera
Hildoceratidae
Jurassic ammonites
Extinct animals of Europe
Toarcian first appearances
Middle Jurassic extinctions

Toarcian life
Jurassic ammonites of Europe
Fossils of Serbia
Fossils of Great Britain
Fossils of France
Fossils of Spain
Fossils of Iran
Fossils of Japan
Fossils of Italy
Fossils of Germany
Fossils of Hungary